Lypova Dolyna Raion was a raion in Sumy Oblast in Central Ukraine. The administrative center of the raion was the urban-type settlement of Lypova Dolyna. The raion was abolished on 18 July 2020 as part of the administrative reform of Ukraine, which reduced the number of raions of Sumy Oblast to five. The last estimate of the raion population was

References

Former raions of Sumy Oblast
1923 establishments in Ukraine
Ukrainian raions abolished during the 2020 administrative reform